The Taranaki by-election of 1907 was a by-election for the electorate of Taranaki held on 14 May 1907 during the 16th New Zealand Parliament.

Background
The contest was triggered due to the death of incumbent MP Edward Smith. Three candidates stood; Henry Okey was the Conservative candidate, Edward Dockrill was the Liberal government endorsed candidate and William Malone an Independent Liberal Okey was the victor, resulting in the defeat of the Liberal Government's preferred candidate because of William Malone, a popular local "Independent Liberal" candidate splitting the government support vote. Because of the vote-splitting, the defeat of the Government candidate did not necessarily mean support for Opposition objection to the Land Bill then before Parliament.

Results
The following table gives the election results:

Okey was later to join the Reform Party upon its formation in February 1909. Malone was later notable during World War I, when he was killed in action leading his troops during the Gallipoli Campaign.

Notes

References

Taranaki 1907
1907 elections in New Zealand
Politics of Taranaki